Almost Perfect is an American sitcom television series that aired on CBS from September 17, 1995, until December  11, 1996. Starring Nancy Travis, Kevin Kilner, David Clennon, Matthew Letscher, and Chip Zien, the series focused on the professional life of the female executive producer of a television cop show, her witty, zany staff which doubled as her family, and initially, how she balanced her high-powered role with that of her newfound romance with a busy assistant D.A. The series was created by Ken Levine, David Isaacs and Robin Schiff, and produced by Levine & Isaacs Productions and Robin Schiff Productions (in season two only), in association with Paramount Network Television.

Levine and Isaacs were previously known for their work as writers and producers on Cheers, as well as Wings airing on NBC. Like the latter shows, Almost Perfect featured a tight-knit ensemble aspect between the cast, which in this case was formed by the production staff of the fictional cop show (as opposed to the Cheers ensemble being that of bar employees and patrons, and Wings group being airport terminal employees).

Synopsis
Almost Perfect starred Nancy Travis as Kim Cooper, a television writer on the (fictional) hit show Blue Justice (a parody of NYPD Blue) who had just been promoted to executive producer. Kim was a prototypical "gotta-have-it-all" young professional; she took pride in being a strong female figure who had risen in the ranks above her mostly male staff. She was headstrong, witty, and had a good sense of direction when it came to the creative matters of Blue Justice, but her personal life was another story.

In the process of working up to her promotion, Kim had struggled to find Mr. Right; many past boyfriends were needy, and eventually unaccepting of Kim's busy schedule. Then she met Mike Ryan (Kevin Kilner), a district attorney. Kim had run into him at a restaurant when she mistook him for the blind date she was supposed to meet, who ended up standing her up. Mike was instantly taken by Kim, and convinced her to have dinner with him, which she did—but not before she quizzed him to make sure he wasn't going to be as shallow as her exes. Before either of them knew it, they were both off on a hot and heavy affair. Both brought extreme pressures to the relationship, mostly due to their high-powered, high-pressure, time-consuming professions.

As Kim learned to juggle her hot career and even hotter, very promising new romance, she received support and camaraderie from her staff at Blue Justice. Heading the writing team was energetic, neurotic Gary Karp (Chip Zien), a veteran of many cop shows who had hoped to become executive producer, but who now had to accept the fact that he was answering to someone ten years younger than him. Gary's attempts to gain more responsibility and edge into Kim's level of importance were always slapstick and comical, and his sexist attitudes often got him into trouble with Kim and his colleagues—but he always meant well. Rob Paley (Matthew Letscher) was the gentle, naive farm boy-turned-Hollywood writer who always gave the more idealistic points of view, and was probably the most neutral to Kim's ascent to executive producer. Neal Luder (David Clennon) was the spaced-out hippie of the group whose ideas and advice were scarily on target occasionally, amid being far removed from reality most of the time. Having something of a colorful career before becoming a TV writer, Neal once worked as a roadie for the Osmond Family in the 1970s.

The series (not the portrayed fictional program) was cancelled only four episodes into its second season.

Cast

Episodes

Season 1 (1995–96)

Season 2 (1996)

Broadcast history

References

External links
 

1990s American sitcoms
1995 American television series debuts
1996 American television series endings
Television series about television
CBS original programming
English-language television shows
Television series by CBS Studios
Television shows set in Los Angeles